Micheline Bernardini (born 1 December 1927) is a French former nude dancer at the Casino de Paris who agreed to model, on 5 July 1946, Louis Réard's two-piece swimsuit, which he called the bikini, named four days after the first test of an American nuclear weapon at the Bikini Atoll.

Réard's bikini
Designer Louis Réard could not find a runway model willing to showcase his revealing design for a two-piece swimsuit. Risqué for its time, it exposed the wearer's navel and much of her buttocks. He hired Bernardini, an 18-year-old nude dancer from the Casino de Paris, as his model.

Photographs of Bernardini and articles about the event were widely carried by the press. The International Herald Tribune alone ran nine stories on the event. The bikini was a hit, especially among men, and Bernardini received over 50,000 fan letters.

Later life
Bernardini later moved to Australia. She appeared from 1948 to 1958 in a number of revues at the Tivoli Theatre, Melbourne.  Footage of her 1946 modeling appearance was featured in an episode of the reality television series Love Lust titled The Bikini, in 2011.

Bernardini posed at age 58 in a bikini for photographer Peter Turnley, in 1986.

References
Notes

1927 births
Living people
French female erotic dancers
People from Colmar
French female models
French emigrants to Australia
Bikinis